The Packerland Conference is an athletic conference of high schools located in northeast Wisconsin. These schools are located chiefly within Door and Kewaunee counties, which are between Green Bay and Lake Michigan. All members are also affiliated with the Wisconsin Interscholastic Athletic Association (WIAA). Sports sponsored by the conference are baseball, basketball, cross-country running, football, golf, soccer, softball, track and field, volleyball and wrestling.

Members

Former members

Olympian-Packerland
For football the Packerland and Olympian conferences combine forming a small and large division.  During the 2011 football season changes were made as Brillion and Manitowoc Roncalli joined the Large Division. The Large Division has ten teams and the small has seven.

Large Division
Chilton
Kewaunee
Mishicot
Oconto
Southern Door
Sturgeon Bay
Valders
Wrightstown
Manitowoc Roncalli
Brillion

Small Division
Algoma
Gibraltar
Hilbert
Manitowoc Lutheran
Reedsville
St.Mary Central
Sevastopol

External links
http://www.packerlandconference.org

References

Wisconsin high school sports conferences
High school sports conferences and leagues in the United States